The 2013 Malaysia Junior Hockey League is slated to begin on 11 January 2013. SSTMI-Thunderbolt is the defending champion for both league and cup.

Before the seasons gets underway, controversial issue involving SSTMI girls' team that submitted an entry to the Under-19 boys league. However the competitions committee met and were against the idea and decided to create a junior girls' league this year.

Teams
A total of 28 teams enter this season, the highest since 1995.

Division 1
The eight teams playing in Division One are as below:
 BJSS
 Malacca High School
 UniKL
 MBPJ
 SSTMI Thunderbolt
 SSTMI Juniors
 MBI-Anderson School
 MSSPP-USM

Division 2
Division Two will have two groups of ten teams each. For Group A the teams comprise mostly from the northern region to cut down the cost of travel.

Group A 
 Sabah Juniors ‡ 
 MSS Perlis
 Nur Insafi
 Anderson Juniors
 PHK-MSS Kelantan
 Matri
 KHA Juniors
 SMK Tunku Abdul Rahman
 1MAS Penang
 SM Sains Tun Azlan Shah

Group B
 Tunas Muda Pahang
 SMK Padang Midin
 MSN Johor
 Politeknik KPT
 KL Sports School
 BJSS Juniors
 Kuala Langat
 SMK Datuk Mohd Taha
 Tunku Besar School
 OLAK-Klang PKT

‡ withdrawn

Results

References

2013 in field hockey